The 1999–2000 NBA season was the 53rd season of the team in the National Basketball Association. The Knicks entered the season as runner-ups of the 1999 NBA Finals, where despite losing to the San Antonio Spurs in five games, they became the first eighth seeded team to reach the NBA Finals. During the off-season, the team signed free agents John Wallace and Andrew Lang. Wallace previously played for the Knicks during the 1996–97 season. After advancing to the NBA Finals as the #8 seed last year, the Knicks won their first three games, but then lost seven of their next ten games, as Patrick Ewing missed the first 20 games with Achilles tendonitis. However, they won 11 of their next 13 games, then later on held a 29–18 record at the All-Star break, and finished second in the Atlantic Division with a 50–32 record, good enough for their first 50-win season since 1997.

Allan Houston led the team in scoring averaging 19.7 points per game, while Latrell Sprewell, who became the team's starting small forward after playing off the bench the previous season, averaged 18.6 points and 1.3 steals per game, and Ewing provided the team with 15.0 points, 9.7 rebounds and 1.4 blocks per game. In addition, Larry Johnson contributed 10.7 points and 5.4 rebounds per game, while Marcus Camby played a sixth man role averaging 10.2 points, 7.8 rebounds and 2.0 blocks per game off the bench, but only played 59 games due to a knee injury. Kurt Thomas provided with 8.0 points and 6.3 rebounds per game also off the bench, while Charlie Ward contributed 7.3 points, 4.2 assists and 1.3 steals per game, and Chris Childs contributed 5.3 points and 4.0 assists per game off the bench. Houston and head coach Jeff Van Gundy both represented the Eastern Conference during the 2000 NBA All-Star Game.

In the Eastern Conference First Round of the playoffs, the Knicks swept the Toronto Raptors in three straight games. In the Eastern Conference Semi-finals, they faced the Miami Heat for the fourth consecutive year. Despite trailing 2–3 after losing Game 5 in Miami, 87–81, the Knicks would defeat the 2nd-seeded Heat in a tough, hard-fought seven-game series, but would lose in six games to the Indiana Pacers in the Eastern Conference Finals, ending their hopes of making the Finals for a second straight year. The Pacers would lose in six games to the Los Angeles Lakers in the NBA Finals. As of 2022, this marks the last time the Knicks had reached the Eastern Conference Finals.

This season marked an end of an era as Ewing was traded to the Seattle SuperSonics in an off-season four-team trade, after playing fifteen seasons in New York. Also following the season, Chris Dudley was traded to the Phoenix Suns, while Wallace was dealt to the Dallas Mavericks, and Lang was released to free agency.

Offseason

NBA Draft

Roster

Regular season

Standings

c – clinched conference title
y – clinched division title
x – clinched playoff spot

Record vs. opponents

Playoffs

|- align="center" bgcolor="#ccffcc"
| 1
| April 23
| Toronto
| W 92–88
| Houston, Sprewell (21)
| Patrick Ewing (9)
| Charlie Ward (5)
| Madison Square Garden19,763
| 1–0
|- align="center" bgcolor="#ccffcc"
| 2
| April 26
| Toronto
| W 84–83
| Latrell Sprewell (25)
| Marcus Camby (13)
| Allan Houston (4)
| Madison Square Garden19,763
| 2–0
|- align="center" bgcolor="#ccffcc"
| 3
| April 30
| @ Toronto
| W 87–80
| Allan Houston (23)
| Patrick Ewing (11)
| Latrell Sprewell (6)
| Air Canada Centre19,996
| 3–0
|-

|- align="center" bgcolor="#ffcccc"
| 1
| May 7
| @ Miami
| L 83–87
| Allan Houston (21)
| Marcus Camby (13)
| Chris Childs (6)
| American Airlines Arena20,053
| 0–1
|- align="center" bgcolor="#ccffcc"
| 2
| May 9
| @ Miami
| W 82–76
| Ewing, Ward (13)
| Ewing, Johnson (8)
| Latrell Sprewell (5)
| American Airlines Arena20,078
| 1–1
|- align="center" bgcolor="#ffcccc"
| 3
| May 12
| Miami
| L 76–77 (OT)
| Allan Houston (24)
| Patrick Ewing (9)
| Charlie Ward (4)
| Madison Square Garden19,763
| 1–2
|- align="center" bgcolor="#ccffcc"
| 4
| May 14
| Miami
| W 91–83
| Charlie Ward (20)
| Patrick Ewing (11)
| Latrell Sprewell (6)
| Madison Square Garden19,763
| 2–2
|- align="center" bgcolor="#ffcccc"
| 5
| May 17
| @ Miami
| L 81–87
| Latrell Sprewell (24)
| Patrick Ewing (11)
| Latrell Sprewell (6)
| American Airlines Arena20,021
| 2–3
|- align="center" bgcolor="#ccffcc"
| 6
| May 19
| Miami
| W 72–70
| Allan Houston (21)
| Patrick Ewing (18)
| Charlie Ward (4)
| Madison Square Garden19,763
| 3–3
|- align="center" bgcolor="#ccffcc"
| 7
| May 21
| @ Miami
| W 83–82
| Latrell Sprewell (24)
| Marcus Camby (12)
| Latrell Sprewell (5)
| American Airlines Arena20,063
| 4–3
|-

|- align="center" bgcolor="#ffcccc"
| 1
| May 23
| @ Indiana
| L 88–102
| Latrell Sprewell (22)
| Camby, Ewing (8)
| Allan Houston (4)
| Conseco Fieldhouse18,345
| 0–1
|- align="center" bgcolor="#ffcccc"
| 2
| May 25
| @ Indiana
| L 84–88
| Larry Johnson (25)
| Marcus Camby (11)
| Latrell Sprewell (6)
| Conseco Fieldhouse18,345
| 0–2
|- align="center" bgcolor="#ccffcc"
| 3
| May 27
| Indiana
| W 98–95
| Latrell Sprewell (32)
| Latrell Sprewell (8)
| Charlie Ward (9)
| Madison Square Garden19,763
| 1–2
|- align="center" bgcolor="#ccffcc"
| 4
| May 29
| Indiana
| W 91–89
| Larry Johnson (25)
| Marcus Camby (8)
| Charlie Ward (7)
| Madison Square Garden19,763
| 2–2
|- align="center" bgcolor="#ffcccc"
| 5
| May 31
| @ Indiana
| L 79–88
| Allan Houston (25)
| four players tied (7)
| three players tied (1)
| Conseco Fieldhouse18,345
| 2–3
|- align="center" bgcolor="#ffcccc"
| 6
| June 2
| Indiana
| L 80–93
| Latrell Sprewell (32)
| Patrick Ewing (12)
| Charlie Ward (6)
| Madison Square Garden19,763
| 2–4
|-

Player stats

NOTE: Please write players statistics in alphabetical order by last name.

Season

Playoffs

Awards and records

Transactions

References

 Knicks on Database Basketball
 Knicks on Basketball Reference

New York Knicks seasons
New York
1999 in sports in New York City
2000 in sports in New York City
1990s in Manhattan
2000s in Manhattan
Madison Square Garden